The Kent Freedom Pass is a scheme offered by Kent County Council to young people in school years 7-11 (and 12-13 if a Young Carer or young person in care / care leavers) who live within the Kent County Council local authority area. The pass offers users unlimited bus travel within Kent (excluding Medway) for a cost of £100 per user (reduced to £50 for users who receive free school meals and no charge for Young Carers or those who are in care/care leavers).

The pass was introduced in 2007 as a direct result of campaigning and consultation by Kent Youth County Council members.

References

Transport in Kent